Mark Boyce may refer to:
 Mark Boyce (ecologist)
 Mark Boyce (singer)